Miloš Biković (born January 13, 1988) is a Serbian actor and producer. His best known films are box office hits Serf and South Wind.

He is also known for his roles in movies Sunstroke directed by Oscar-winning director Nikita Mikhalkov and Dukhless 2, and his portrayal of Aleksandar "Tirke" Tirnanić in the films Montevideo, God Bless You! and See You in Montevideo directed by Dragan Bjelogrlić. He also holds Russian citizenship.

Early life and education
His parents divorced when he was very young, after which his father moved to Germany. Biković has since lived with his mother. His older brother, Mihailo, is a Serbian Orthodox monk.

Biković was educated at the XIV Gymnasium of Belgrade, and is fluent in Serbian, English and Russian.

Biković is currently at Doctoral studies at the University of Arts in Belgrade.

Acting career 

Biković made his acting debut on television, in the popular RTS series The Dollars Are Coming (Serbian Cyrillic: Стижу долари). He came to further prominence with the comedy series White Ship (Bela lađa), in which he acted from 2006 to 2011. In 2008, Biković had a supporting role in the B92 drama series The Storks Will Return (Vratiće se rode). He subsequently appeared in two short films, Assignment: Ten Minutes (Zadatak: 10 minuta) in 2009, and Plus in 2010.

In 2010, Biković was cast to portray Serbian footballer Aleksandar "Tirke" Tirnanić in Montevideo, God Bless You! (Montevideo, Bog te video!). Directed by Dragan Bjelogrlić, it is the true story of the Yugoslavia national football team qualifying for the 1930 FIFA World Cup. Biković and his castmates had to learn to play football for the film. Montevideo, God Bless You! premiered on 20 December 2010, and became the highest-grossing film in Serbia and the Balkan region. It was also selected as the Serbian entry for the Best Foreign Language Film at the 84th Academy Awards. The film brought Biković MTV Adria Movie Award and Niš Film Festival for Best Actor, as well as a FIPRESCI Serbia Award for Best Actor nomination. It also made him a household name in Serbia, and earned him the Hello! Magazine Award for the Personality of the Year in 2011. The television series adapted from Montevideo, God Bless You!, which features some scenes and characters that do not appear in the original film, premiered on the RTS on 13 February 2012.

The following year, Biković had an episode appearance in the television series Mixed Meat (Mešano meso). He also made his stage debut in the Atelje 212 production Goodbye SFRY (Zbogom SFRJ), inspired by Wolfgang Becker's film Good Bye, Lenin! In 2012, Biković portrayed Serbian scientist Mihajlo Petrović Alas in Professor Kosta Vujic's Hat (Šešir profesora Koste Vujića), a film adaptation of the novel of the same name by Milovan Vitezović directed by Zdravko Šotra. The film was critically acclaimed and commercially successful.

In 2013, Biković starred the RTS series Ravna Gora that takes place in Yugoslavia during World War II and tells the story of the Chetnik resistance movement, the National Theatre production of The Lady of the Camellias, and the German independent short film Great. The following year, he starred in the sequel to Montevideo, God Bless You!, the box-office hit See You in Montevideo (Montevideo, vidimo se!) and its eponymous spin-off series, and the film and television adaptation of Mir-Jam's novel Single in a Marriage (Samac u braku), titled, respectively, When Love Is Late (Kad ljubav zakasni) and Single in a Marriage.

He regularly plays in Russian films. Biković appeared in Sunstroke (2014), which marked his Russian debut, a film directed by Nikita Mikhalkov, based on Ivan Bunin's works Sunstroke and Cursed Days. He also appeared in Dukhless 2 (2015). Biković also acted in the 2018 films Ice and Beyond the Edge.

During 2018, Biković also acted in the movies Ice and Beyond the Edge with Antonio Banderas, Mify and TV series Hotel Eleon, which represent sequel of the famous and successful TV comedy Kitchen. Role of Pavel in series Hotel Eleon brought him a status of star in Russia, Kazakhstan, Azerbaijan and rest of the former USSR countries.

In 2018, Biković appeared in the leading role of the movie The South Wind, directed by Miloš Avramović, which earned a record number of unique views. In 2020, he also appeared in a television series of the same name.

In 2019, Biković appeared in the leading role of the movie The Balkan Line, based on true stories. A Russian-Serbian action movie, directed by Andrei Vologin, is dedicated to the secret operation to take over Slatina airport in Kosovo and Metohija during the 1999 NATO bombing in FR Yugoslavia. It is premiered in Belgrade on March 19, 2019, five days before the 20th anniversary of the NATO bombing of the FR Yugoslavia. At the end of 2019, Biković had a leading role in the movie Servant, which became the most viewed movie in the history of cinema of Russia. In only one day, the movie watched more than 750,000 people. The movie was directed by Klim Shipenko.

In 2020, he starred in the Russian-Serbian romantic comedy Hotel Belgrade alongside Jakov Jevtović and Miodrag Radonjić.

Other work 
Biković and his Montevideo, God Bless You! fellows played football for various humanitarian causes, such as the Battle for Babies on 27 September 2011. Along with Vlade Divac, Ana Divac, Nađa Higl and Marchelo, he took part in the Really Important campaign, led by the Vlade & Ana Divac Foundation. Biković also participated in Enter the Theatre! campaign; its task is to popularize theatre among the youth. In November 2012, Biković started Twitter Syndicate, a charity account on Twitter.

Biković and his Montevideo, God Bless You! fellow Tamara Dragičević appeared in the music video for Kiki Lesendrić's single "Slučajno", released in May 2011. In 2014, he starred in and directed the music video for Nevena Božović's song "Bal".

In February 2012, Biković and other Serbian celebrities presented the new model of BMW of the BMW 3 Series.

In 2016, he founded a production company Archangel studios and produced 4 projects South Wind, The Balkan Line, Embasy, and Hotel Belgrade.

Personal and media life 
Religion plays an important part of Milos Bikovic's life.

Biković is a close friend of his Montevideo, God Bless You! fellow Petar Strugar. Biković cited Zoran Radmilović as his role model, and Fyodor Dostoyevsky as his favourite writer.

He is dating Ivana Malic

Filmography

Stage roles

Awards and nominations

References

External links 
 Miloš Biković at the Internet Movie Database

1988 births
Living people
Serbian male film actors
Serbian male stage actors
Serbian male television actors
Male actors from Belgrade
Serbian male models
21st-century Serbian male actors
Serb models
Serbian expatriates in Russia
Naturalised citizens of Russia
Recipients of the Medal of Pushkin